Mera is a town in the eastern foothills of the Ecuadorian Andes. It is also the name of the Canton in Pastaza Province of which it is a part.

It lends its name to Shell Mera, a larger town 4 miles to the east.
 Aerial photograph of Mera

Populated places in Pastaza Province